Kenneth Robert James Hall (b 1959)  has been Dean of Clogher since 2009.

He was educated at Royal School Dungannon and Trinity College Dublin and ordained in 1998. After curacies in Derryloran, Drumglass and Brackaville he held  incumbencies at Coalisland  and Enniskillen  until his appointment as Dean.

References

Irish Anglicans
1959 births
Deans of Clogher
Living people